The Torrington Braves were a short lived minor league baseball team based in Torrington, Connecticut. In 1950, the Braves played as members of the Class B level 1950 Colonial League, which permanently folded during the 1950 season with the Braves in fourth place. Torrington hosted home minor league games at Fuessenich Park.

History
Minor league baseball began in Torrington, Connecticut in 1896, when the Torrington Tornadoes became members of the Naugatuck Valley League. The 1897 Torrington Demons played the season in the Connecticut League.

After a five decade absence, minor league baseball returned to Torrington in 1950 for a partial season, when the Stamford Pioneers, a Colonial League franchise was replaced by a new Torrington franchise.

The Torrington "Braves" became members of the six–team Class B level Colonial League, before the league folded during the season. The Braves joined the Bridgeport Bees, Bristol Owls, Kingston Colonials, Poughkeepsie Chiefs and  Waterbury Timers in beginning Colonial League play on May 2, 1950.

On July 16, 1950, the Braves were in fourth place when the Colonial League folded. Torrington had a record of 33–32 when the league folded, playing the season under manager Merle Strachan. The Braves scored 303 total runs, last in the league, and surrendered 304 runs. Torrington finished 8.0 games behind the first place Poughkeepsie Chiefs in the final standings. 

The Colonial League permanently folded after the 1950 season. Torrington, Connecticut has not hosted another minor league team.

The ballpark
The 1950 Torrington Braves played home minor league games at Fuessenich Park. The ballpark was previously called "League Park" and was said to have been "the first place in Torrington where baseball was played," having been in use as a public park beginning in 1838. Frederick F. Fuessenich purchased League Park in 1912 and donated it to the city in 1918. The ballpark was named for his wife, Elizabeth Blake Fuessenich, who died in 1914. Still in use as a ballpark today, Fuessnich Park is located at 33 Coe Place in Torrington.

Year–by–year record

Notable alumni
No Torrington Braves alumni appeared in the major leagues. Ed Musial, younger brother of Baseball Hall of Fame member Stan Musial played for the Braves, hitting .288 in his final professional season.

References

External links
Torrington - Baseball Reference
Fuessenich Park photos

Defunct baseball teams in Connecticut
Colonial League teams
Baseball teams established in 1950
Baseball teams disestablished in 1950
Torrington, Connecticut